Balaguier-sur-Rance is a commune in the Aveyron department in the Occitanie region of southern France.

The inhabitants of the commune are known as Balaguiérois or Balaguiéroises.

Geography
Balaguier-sur-Rance is located some 32 km east of Albi and just north of Saint-Sernin-sur-Rance. The whole western border of the commune is the departmental boundary between Aveyron and Tarn. The commune is divided into two parts situated on either side of the Rance river. Balaguier le Maigre (the thin) or le Vieux (the old) is on the right bank with its houses clinging to a rocky outcrop that supported a fortified structure of which there remains no trace. On the left bank is Balaguier le Gras (the fat) with the church, the town hall, and a chateau from the 15th and 16th centuries. Both banks are connected by a stone bridge from the 15th century. Access to the commune is by the D33 road from Curvalle in the north-west which passes through the commune and the village and joins the D999 on the communal border then continues to Saint-Sernin-sur-Rance. The D999 passes through the south of the commune as it goes from Alban to Vabres-l'Abbaye.

The Rance river flows through the centre of the commune from east to west where it continues north-west to join the Tarn east of Trébas. Many tributaries rise in the commune on both banks of the Rance and flow into it.

Neighbouring communes and villages

Administration

List of Successive Mayors

Demography
In 2017 the commune had 92 inhabitants.

Sites and monuments

A copy of a menhir statue found when working under the main road in the village.
A Chateau Keep from the 15th and 16th centuries.

Notable people linked to the commune
Hippolyte Coste, born 20 December 1858 in Balaguier-sur-Rance at Mas d'Estioussès.

See also
Communes of the Aveyron department

References

External links
Balaguier-sur-Rance on the old National Geographic Institute website 
Balaguier-sur-Rance on Géoportail, National Geographic Institute (IGN) website 
Balaguier on the 1750 Cassini Map

Communes of Aveyron